Doyle Kenady (29 August 1948 – 3 February 1999) was a world champion powerlifter and strongman competitor from the United States. Doyle was best known for winning the IPF World Powerlifting Championships in 1978 and 1980 in the +110 kg weight class. Doyle Kenady broke the world record in the deadlift at the 1986 Budweiser World Recorder Breakers Meet Deadlifting a 903-pound World Record on April 6, 1986 in a deadlift suit. Doyle competed in the 1983 World's Strongest Man contest in Christchurch, New Zealand, finishing in 7th place overall.

References 

American powerlifters
American strength athletes
1999 deaths
1948 births
World Games gold medalists
Competitors at the 1981 World Games
20th-century American people